Anastas Petrov (born 24 June 1973) is a retired Bulgarian footballer and the current manager of Balkan Varvara. He was born in Pazardzhik and started his career with the local team PFC Hebar. He also turned out for PFC Botev Plovdiv (on three occasions), PFC Spartak Varna (on two occasions), PFC Naftex Burgas and PFC Marek Dupnitsa.

References

External links

Bulgarian footballers
1973 births
Living people
Association football midfielders
First Professional Football League (Bulgaria) players
Second Professional Football League (Bulgaria) players
FC Hebar Pazardzhik players
Botev Plovdiv players
PFC Spartak Varna players
Sportspeople from Pazardzhik